This incomplete list of French ambassadors to the Holy See since the Middle Ages includes all regimes from the Kingdom of France to the current French Republic:

Ambassadors from the Kingdom of France
 1491-1499: Jean de Bilhères
 1547-1550: Claude d'Urfé
 1564-1566: Henri Cleutin
 1568-1570: Charles d'Angennes de Rambouillet
 1654-1659?: Hugues de Lionne
 1662-1665: Charles III de Créquy
 1667-1670?: Charles d'Albert d'Ailly
 1698-1700: Cardinal de Bouillon
 1700-1701: Louis I, Prince of Monaco, died in office
 1701-1706: Toussaint de Forbin-Janson
 1715-?: Michel Amelot de Gournay
 1721-1724: Pierre Guérin de Tencin
 1724-1731: Melchior de Polignac
 1731-1740: Paul-Hippolyte de Beauvilliers, duke of Saint-Aignan
 1745-1747: Frédéric Jérôme de La Rochefoucauld
 1748-1752: Louis Jules Mancini Mazarini
 1753-1757: Étienne François, count of Stainville, later duc de Choiseul
 1758-1762: Henri Joseph Bouchard d'Esparbès de Lussan d'Aubeterre
 1769-1791: François-Joachim de Pierre de Bernis

Officially recalled in 1791, Bernis was not replaced due to the French Revolution

Ambassadors 1789-1945
 1793?-1797?: François Cacault, envoy to the Pope
 1797: Joseph Bonaparte
 1801-1803: François Cacault (second appointment)
 1803-1806: Joseph Fesch
 1806: Gabriel Cortois de PressignyRome was annexed to the French Empire between 1806-1814 1814-1816: Gabriel Cortois de Pressigny
 1816-1822?: Pierre Louis Jean Casimir de Blacas
 1822-1828: Anne-Adrien-Pierre de Montmorency-Laval
 1828-1829: François-René de Chateaubriand, the famous Romantic poet
 1829-1830: Auguste, comte de La Ferronays
 1832-1841: Louis de Beaupoil de Saint-Aulaire
 1845-1848: Pellegrino Rossi
 1849: Francisque de Corcelle
 1850-1857: Alphonse de Rayneval
 1857-1861: Agénor de Gramont
 1861-1862: Charles, marquis de La Valette
 1862-1863: Godefroi, prince de La Tour d'Auvergne-Lauraguais
 1864-1868: Eugène de Sartiges
 1868-?: Marquis de Banneville
Third Republic
 1870-1871: Édouard Lefebvre de Béhaine, chargé d'affaires 1871-1873: Count Bernard d'Harcourt
 1873-1876: Francisque de Corcelle (second appointment)
 1876-1878: Georges Napoléon Baude
 1878-1880: Joseph de Cadoine de Gabriac
 1880-1882: Ferdinand Henry de Navenne
 1882-1896: Édouard Lefebvre de Béhaine (was chargé d'affaires in 1870)
 1896-1898: Eugène Poubelle
 1899?-1904: Armand NisardDiplomatic relations were broken from 1904-1921 due to the French separation of Church and State 1920: Gabriel Hanotaux, extraordinary embassy for the canonization of Joan of Arc 1921-1923: Charles Jonnart
 1932-1940: François Charles-Roux
 1940: Wladimir d'Ormesson

Vichy France
 1940-1944: Léon Bérard
 François de Vial, attaché''

Ambassadors since 1945

Provisional Government
 1945-1948: Jacques Maritain

Fourth Republic
 1948-1956: Wladimir d'Ormesson (second appointment)
 1956-1959: Roland de Margerie

Fifth Republic
 1959-1964: Guy de la Tournelle
...
 1983-1985: Xavier de La Chevalerie
 1985-1988: Bertrand Dufourcq
 1988-1991: Jean-Bernard Raimond
 1991-1993: René Ala
 1993-1995: Alain Pierret
 1995-1998: Jean-Louis Lucet
 1998-2000: Jean Guéguinou
 2000-2001: Alain Dejammet
 2001-2005: Pierre Morel
 2005-2007: Bernard Kessedjian
 2009-2012: Stanislas de Laboulaye
 2012-2015: Bruno Joubert
 2016-2018: Philippe Zeller
 2019-present: Élisabeth Beton-Delègue

France
 
Holy See